Jessie Ray Green is an American former wide receiver in the National Football League.

Biography
Green was born February 21, 1954, in Malakoff, Texas.

Career
Green was drafted by the Green Bay Packers in the tenth round of the 1976 NFL Draft and was a member of the team that season. After two years away from the NFL, he spent two seasons with the Seattle Seahawks.

He played at the collegiate level at the University of Tulsa.

See also
List of Green Bay Packers players

References

People from Henderson County, Texas
Green Bay Packers players
Seattle Seahawks players
American football wide receivers
Tulsa Golden Hurricane football players
Players of American football from Texas
1954 births
Living people